Dmitry Aleksandrovich Aliseyko (born 28 August 1992) is a Belarusian professional footballer who plays for Ostrovets.

Career
Born in Bobruisk, Aliseyko began playing football in FC Dinamo Minsk youth system. He made his Belarusian Premier League debut with FC Torpedo-BelAZ Zhodino in 2012, before moving to FC Neman Grodno for the 2013 season.

Honours
Dinamo Brest
Belarusian Cup winner: 2016–17, 2017–18

References

External links
 
 

1992 births
Living people
People from Babruysk
Sportspeople from Mogilev Region
Belarusian footballers
Belarus international footballers
Association football defenders
Belarusian expatriate footballers
Expatriate footballers in Russia
FC Dinamo Minsk players
FC Torpedo-BelAZ Zhodino players
FC Neman Grodno players
FC Slutsk players
FC Dynamo Brest players
FC Isloch Minsk Raion players
FC Khimki players
FC Minsk players
FC Ostrovets players